Giannis  Kyrastas (25 October 1952 – 1 April 2004) was a Greek footballer and football manager.

Club career 
Born in Piraeus, Kyrastas started his football career in Olympiacos, where he played his first game on 10 December 1972 against Kavala. With Olympiacos he played 223 games, 16 of them in European competitions, and won five Greek Championships and three Greek Cups.

In 1981, he went, together with Mike Galakos, to archrival Panathinaikos, where he played in 145 games, 14 of them in European competitions, and won two Greek Championships and three Greek Cups. He retired in 1986 after playing his last game against Aris in November.

Kyrastas made 46 appearances for the Greece national team, from 15 November 1974 to 19 May 1985. He also played in the 1980 UEFA European Championship.

Coaching career 
After retiring, he became a coach. Starting in the 1987–88 season and until 2001 he successfully coached many teams, including Ethnikos Piraeus, Paniliakos (twice), Panionios FC, Iraklis and finally Panathinaikos. After his second time as coach of Panathinaikos, he retired from coaching.

Death 
Kyrastas was admitted on 5 March 2004 to hospital with septicaemia, after being infected with the rare Fournier gangrene. His condition was said to be improving, but on, 30 March he went into a decline from which he was not to recover. He died on 1 April 2004 at the age of 51.

The football players and staff of Panathinaikos, devoted the Double of 2004 in his memory.

References

External links 

1952 births
2004 deaths
Deaths from sepsis
Association football midfielders
Greece international footballers
Greek football managers
Panathinaikos F.C. players
Panathinaikos F.C. managers
Olympiacos F.C. players
Footballers from Athens
Greek footballers
Iraklis Thessaloniki F.C. managers
UEFA Euro 1980 players
Infectious disease deaths in Greece
Super League Greece players
Super League Greece managers
Panionios F.C. managers
Ethnikos Piraeus F.C. managers
Deaths from gangrene